"Christmas Is the Time to Say 'I Love You'" is a holiday rock song by Billy Squier, released in 1981 as the B-side of his hit "My Kinda Lover" (Capitol 5037). In 1981, a video of the song was recorded with MTV VJs and staff members singing along with a live performance by Squier. VJ Martha Quinn remembers it as her number one moment when working for MTV. A large number of the background singers and revelers was made up of New York and Philadelphia radio and record people, including Anita Gevinson from WMMR.

Covers
The song has been covered by Darlene Love, Alexa Vega, and by SR-71. Katharine McPhee recorded a cover of the song on her Christmas album, Christmas is the Time to Say I Love You, which was released on October 12, 2010.

References

1981 songs
American Christmas songs
Billy Squier songs
1981 singles
Songs written by Billy Squier
Capitol Records singles